Fisher Grove State Park is a South Dakota state park in Spink County, South Dakota in the United States. The park is open for year-round recreation including camping, swimming, fishing, hiking and boating.

The park is managed and maintained by the Fisher Grove Country Club, which also manages the nine-hole golf course adjacent to the park.

History
Fisher Grove State Park is named for Frank I. Fisher, the first permanent European settler in Spink County.

Recreation
Fisher Grove State Park is open for year-round recreation. There are 22 campsites which feature electric hook-ups. Fishing and a canoe launch to the James River are available.

See also
List of South Dakota state parks

References

External links
 Fisher Grove State Park

Protected areas of Spink County, South Dakota
State parks of South Dakota